Thérèse Brady was an Irish psychologist.

Career
Brady initially worked as a secretary for a voluntary organisation providing support for people with tuberculosis. She then attended University College Dublin graduating in 1966. After graduation she worked at the Mater Hospital Child Guidance Clinic. She then helped to develop the Child Guidance Clinic in Ballymun.

She was active in establishing the Psychological Society of Ireland and in 1974 was elected its president.

In 1979, she returned to University College Dublin to establish the training programme in clinical psychology.

In 1985, she became a director of the Bereavement Support service of the Irish Hospice Foundation.

Publications
 Brady, T, Paradoxes in the Pursuit of Psychological Well-Being, Irish Journal of Psychology, 11, 3, 277–298.

Heritage
The library at the Irish Hospice Foundation is named the Thérèse Brady Library. It focuses on bereavement, palliative care and end-of-life issues.

The School of Psychology at University College Dublin awards the Therésè Brady Medal to the graduating student in the PhD Clinical Psychology programme whose research thesis is judged to show exceptional clinical sensitivity.

References

1930 births
1999 deaths
Irish psychologists
Irish women psychologists
20th-century psychologists
Academics of University College Dublin